Days to Come or The Days to Come may refer to:

Music

Bands
Days to Come, Albany Georgia rock band

Albums
Days to Come (album) (2006), the third studio album by Bonobo
Days to Come (EP) (2012), an EP by American DJ Seven Lions

Songs
"Days to Come", by Circulatory System from Circulatory System (2001)
"Days to Come", from the self-titled album by Bonobo (2006)
"Days to Come", song by Opshop from Second Hand Planet
"Days to Come", song by Rachelle Ann Go from I Care (album)
"The Days to Come", song by the 77s from Sticks and Stones (1990)
"The Days to Come", song by Arno Cost

Others
The Days to Come, 2019 film
"The Days to Come" (1971), a play by Yehoshua Sobol
Days to Come, an episode from the BBC television anthology series Play of the Month
Days to Come, an online travel blog by TourRadar

See also
Good Days to Come (2011), a film that won Best Film in the 48th International Antalya Golden Orange Film Festival